Anticon Label Sampler: 1999-2004 is a compilation album released by American hip hop record label Anticon in 2004. It peaked at number 25 on CMJ's Hip Hop chart.

Critical reception
Marisa Brown of AllMusic gave the album 3.5 stars out of 5, saying: "Even though most of the songs are under three minutes, there isn't much superfluous filler to weigh down the record." Susanna Bolle of XLR8R said: "For those not already familiar with Anticon, this budget-priced compilation provides an excellent primer, collecting tracks by the label's extended stable of artists, from the fantastic, absurdist rhymes of Themselves to the acerbic rants of Sole."

Track listing

References

External links
 

2004 compilation albums
Anticon albums
Record label compilation albums